Ibrahim bey Musa Agha oghlu Usubov  (March 6, 1872 – June 16, 1920) was an Azerbaijani Major General in Russian Imperial Army and Azerbaijan Democratic Republic.

Early life
Ibrahim bey Usubov was born to the family of military officer, Musa Agha Usubov on March 6, 1872 in Yukhary-Salakhly village of Qazakh uyezd. Receiving military upbringing and discipline from his father, Ibrahim bey Usubov went to famous Constantine Artillery School. After graduation, Usubov received a rank of podporuchik and was assigned to Tambov 122nd Infantry Regiment.

Family 
Musa Agha who was an officer in Russian Imperial Army and received military rank of praporshchik July 2, 1839, was Deputy Chief of Muslim honour detachment and Commander in Chief of Separate Caucasian Corps prince Vorontsov. For his bravery in the battles against mountain peoples in village Dargo and Gerzel on January 28, 1845 he was awarded with Order of Saint Stanislaus of 3rd degree. On July 9, 1848 Musa Agha Usubov became the second lieutenant and on December 4, 1854 received poruchik (Lieutenant) rank.

In 1910, he married Govher Khanum who was the youngest daughter of the Transcaucasian Mufti Mirza Huseyn Afandi Qayibov. He had only one daughter - Nigar Usubova. She was a professor of Baku Academy of Music.

Military career
In 1904, Usubov participated in Russo-Japanese War in a rank of Stabskapitän. For courage at the Battle at Port Arthur, Usubov was awarded the Order of St. Vladimir 4th degree and the Order of St. Stanislaus (with sword and bow) the third degree.

In later years, Usubov took a part in World War I. On October 14, 1914, battalion headed by Usubov attacked positions near the Mizinec village pushing Austrian forces back. All Austrian counterattacks lasting for three days were rebuffed by Usubov's battalion. In December 1914, he was promoted to the rank of lieutenant-colonel. In 1915, he was promoted to the rank of colonel. On September 9, 1915 Usubov was decorated with the Order of Saint George 4th degree for courage in battle. In January 1917, he was appointed the Commander of the brigade of 133rd Infantry Division. On July 1, 1917 he was promoted to the major general.

After the October Revolution in Russia Ibrahim bey Usubov took part in formation of Azerbaijan Army in Azerbaijan Democratic Republic (ADR). The government of ADR sent Usubov to Italy for procurement of military uniforms for the army. He negotiated with companies in Genoa, Milan, Trento, Turin and Verona.

In beginning of June, 1920, Usubov was arrested by the Bolsheviks at his home. He was executed by firing squad on June 16, 1920.

Awards 
  - (1904)
  - (11.12.1905)
  - (11.12.1905)
  - (21.11.1906)
  - (6.12.1909)
  - (6.02.1913)
  - (1.03.1915)
  - (19.04.1915)
  - (29.12.1916)
  - (29.04.1917)
  - (6.12.1909) - (17.05.1917)

References

Footnotes

Works cited 
.

1872 births
1920 deaths
People from Qazax District
Imperial Russian Army generals
Russian military personnel of the Russo-Japanese War
Russian military personnel of World War I
Azerbaijani people of World War I
Azerbaijani nobility
Generals of the Azerbaijan Democratic Republic
Recipients of the Order of Saint Stanislaus (Russian)
Deaths by firearm in Azerbaijan
Executed Azerbaijani people
Executed politicians
Azerbaijani people executed by the Soviet Union
Azerbaijani generals of Imperial Russian Army